A Safety Match may refer to:
 A Safety Match (play)
 A Safety Match (novel)